Raymond de Braconnier (born 2 February 1918) was a Belgian alpine skier. He competed in the men's combined event at the 1936 Winter Olympics.

References

External links
 

1918 births
Possibly living people
Belgian male alpine skiers
Olympic alpine skiers of Belgium
Alpine skiers at the 1936 Winter Olympics
Place of birth missing